Climbing Mount Improbable is a 1996 popular science book by Richard Dawkins. The book is about probability and how it applies to the theory of evolution. It is designed to debunk claims by creationists about the probability of naturalistic mechanisms like natural selection.

The main metaphorical treatment is of a geographical landscape upon which evolution can ascend only gradually and cannot climb cliffs (that is known as an adaptive landscape). In the book, Dawkins gives ideas about a seemingly complex mechanism coming about from many gradual steps that were previously unseen.

The book grew out of the annual Royal Institution Christmas Lectures, which Dawkins delivered in 1991 (see Growing Up in the Universe). It is illustrated by Dawkins' wife at the time, Lalla Ward, and is dedicated to Robert Winston, "a good doctor and a good man".

References

1996 non-fiction books
Books about evolution
Books by Richard Dawkins
Criticism of creationism
English-language books
English non-fiction books